Xestaea is a genus of flowering plants belonging to the family Gentianaceae.

Its native range is Southern Mexico to Venezuela.

Species:
 Xestaea lisianthoides Griseb.

References

Gentianaceae
Gentianaceae genera